Armagh (2021 Population 1,439) is a municipality in the Bellechasse Regional County Municipality in the Chaudière-Appalaches region of Quebec.

It was named after Armagh in Ireland.

Demographics

References

External links 
Armagh Official site.

Municipalities in Quebec
Designated places in Quebec
Incorporated places in Chaudière-Appalaches